Mwape Musonda (born 8 November 1990) is a Zambian professional footballer who plays as a forward.

References

1990 births
Living people
Zambian footballers
Association football forwards
Konkola Mine Police F.C. players
Zanaco F.C. players
Orlando Pirates F.C. players
Lamontville Golden Arrows F.C. players
Black Leopards F.C. players
Hatta Club players
Al-Sahel SC (Saudi Arabia) players
South African Premier Division players
National First Division players
UAE Pro League players
Saudi First Division League players
Zambia international footballers
Zambian expatriate footballers
Zambian expatriate sportspeople in South Africa
Expatriate soccer players in South Africa
Zambian expatriate sportspeople in the United Arab Emirates
Expatriate footballers in the United Arab Emirates
Zambian expatriate sportspeople in Saudi Arabia
Expatriate footballers in Saudi Arabia